National Theatre or National Theater may refer to:

Africa
Ethiopian National Theatre, Addis Ababa
National Theatre of Ghana, Accra
Kenya National Theatre, Nairobi
National Arts Theatre, Lagos, Nigeria
National Theatre of Somalia, Mogadishu
National Theatre (Sudan), Omdurman
National Theatre of Tunisia, Tunis
National Theatre of Uganda, Kampala

Asia

Japan
National Theatre of Japan, Tokyo
New National Theatre Tokyo
National Noh Theatre, Tokyo
National Bunraku Theatre, Osaka
National Theater Okinawa, Urasoe, designed by Shin Takamatsu

Other Asian countries 
National Theatre of Yangon, Burma
Preah Suramarit National Theatre, Phnom Penh, Cambodia 
Habima Theatre, Tel Aviv, Israel
Palestinian National Theatre, Jerusalem
National Theater and Concert Hall, Taipei, Taiwan
National Theatre, Singapore
National Theater of Korea, Seoul, South Korea
National Theatre (Thailand)

Oceania
National Theatre, Launceston, Tasmania, Australia
National Theatre, Melbourne, Victoria, Australia
National Theatre Company (Papua New Guinea)
National Theatre, Sydney, New South Wales, Australia

Europe

Albania
National Theatre of Albania, Tirana
National Theatre of Opera and Ballet of Albania, Tirana

Bosnia and Herzegovina
National Theatre Mostar 
Bosnian National Theatre Zenica
Sarajevo National Theatre

Czech Republic
National Theatre Brno
National Theatre (Prague)
National Theatre Ballet (Prague)

Germany
Deutsches Nationaltheater and Staatskapelle Weimar
National Theatre Mannheim
National Theatre Munich

France
 Comédie-Française (Paris)
 National Theatre of Strasbourg
 Odéon-Théâtre de l'Europe
 National Theatre of Chaillot (Paris)
 Théâtre national de la Colline (Paris)
 Théâtre national de l'Opéra-Comique (Paris)

Greece
National Theatre of Greece, Athens
National Theatre of Northern Greece, Thessaloniki

Hungary
National Theatre (Budapest)
National Theatre of Győr
National Theatre of Miskolc
National Theatre of Pécs
National Theatre of Szeged

Netherlands 
 Koninklijke Schouwburg, a building in The Hague
 Het Nationale Theater, a theater company in The Hague

Portugal
D. Maria II National Theatre, Lisbon
São João National Theatre, Porto

Romania
National Theatre Bucharest
Cluj-Napoca National Theatre
Iași National Theatre

Serbia
National Theatre in Belgrade
National Theatre in Niš
Serbian National Theatre, Novi Sad
National Theatre in Subotica
National Theatre "Toša Jovanović", Zrenjanin

Spain
National Theater Prize
Centro Dramático Nacional, Madrid
National Theatre of Catalonia, Barcelona

United Kingdom
Royal National Theatre (also known simply as the National Theatre), London
National Theatre of Scotland, a touring company
National Theatre Wales, a touring company with English-language productions
Theatr Genedlaethol Cymru, a touring company with Welsh-language productions
National Theatre of England, a theatre in London in existence from 1914 to 1915; see Peacock Theatre
The proposed National Theatre of Cornwall

Other European countries
Burgtheater or Austrian National Theatre, Vienna, Austria
Ivan Vazov National Theatre, Sofia, Bulgaria
Croatian National Theatre (disambiguation), several theatres in Croatia
Finnish National Theatre, Helsinki, Finland
National Theatre of Iceland, Reykjavík, Iceland
Abbey Theatre, also known as the National Theatre of Ireland, Dublin, Ireland
Latvian National Theatre, Riga, Latvia
Montenegrin National Theatre, Podgorica, Montenegro
National Theatre (Oslo), Norway
National Theatre, Warsaw, Poland
Slovak National Theater, Bratislava, Slovakia
Slovene National Theatre (disambiguation), several theatres in Slovenia

The Americas

Mexico
National Theatre of Mexico, Mexico City
National Theatre Company of Mexico, Mexico City

United States
American National Theater and Academy, a congressionally chartered non-profit theatre producer
National Theatre Conservatory, Denver, Colorado
National Theatre, Boston (1836), Massachusetts
National Theatre, Boston (1911), Massachusetts
National Theatre (Detroit, Michigan)
National Theatre, a short-lived playhouse (1836–1841) which was originally built in 1833 as Lorenzo Da Ponte's Italian Opera House, New York City
National Theatre (New York), former name of the Nederlander Theatre in New York City, New York
National Theater of the United States of America, a company in New York City, New York
National Theater (Manhattan), former Yiddish theatre in New York City, New York
National Theater (Richmond, Virginia)
National Theatre (Washington, D.C.)

Other countries in the Americas 
Teatro Nacional Cervantes or Cervantes National Theatre, Buenos Aires, Argentina
Cláudio Santoro National Theater, Brasília, Brazil
National Theatre School of Canada, Montreal, Canada
Teatro de Cristóbal Colón, Bogotá, Colombia
National Theatre of Costa Rica, San Jose, Costa Rica
National Theatre of Cuba, Havana, Cuba
Teatro Nacional (Santo Domingo), Dominican Republic
Teatro Nacional de El Salvador, San Salvador, El Salvador
Rubén Darío National Theatre, Managua, Nicaragua
National Theatre of Panama, Panama City, Panama
Gran Teatro Nacional, Lima, Peru
National Theatre of Venezuela, Caracas, Venezuela

See also
List of national theatres, theaters supported at least in part by national funds

Teatro Nacional (disambiguation), National Theatre in Spanish and Portuguese
National Theatre of the Deaf, a US touring company
National Theatre of Brent, a British comedy double act
Nationalteatern, a Swedish rock group